Kari Hanska (born 23 March 1949) is a Finnish rower. He competed in the men's coxless pair event at the 1976 Summer Olympics.

References

External links
 

1949 births
Living people
Finnish male rowers
Olympic rowers of Finland
Rowers at the 1976 Summer Olympics
People from Porvoo
Sportspeople from Uusimaa